RedGorilla Music Fest is an annual independent music festival in Austin, Texas.

Many artists performed at RedGorilla early in their careers, including Macklemore & Ryan Lewis, Kendrick Lamar, Imagine Dragons, The National, Foster the People, Cage the Elephant, and Ryan Bingham.

RedGorilla launched nearly 15 years ago as the DreamScapers Artist Showcase. In 2007, the founders re-branded the event as RedGorilla.  Since then, RedGorilla has grown from over 200 to 500 performers.

References

External links 
Official Website
Myspace Homepage
Songstuff News Article
EJN News Article

Music festivals in Texas
Festivals in Austin, Texas
Music conferences